The Liegnitz Ritter-Akademie or knight academy  was a school for the sons of the silesian aristocracy and landed gentry established in early 18th century, shortly after the signing of the Treaty of Altranstädt (1707). The school was erected in the Habsburg ruled town of Liegnitz, and at least in part was founded from money earlier collected by Duke George Rudolf of Liegnitz, who had planned school of this type in his Capital.
It operated as a school until 1945 and then After World War II, in 1945–1992, the building served as one of the main Soviet quarters in people's Poland, specifically for the Northern Group of Forces.

History 
The duke of Liegnitz, George Rudolf of Liegnitz († 1653) of the Piast dynasty, died childless. He left in his will of 1646 substantial means for the establishment a school for noble Protestant boys from Silesia, placed under the administration of the Liegnitz Johanniskirche through the Johannisstiftung. After the death of his great-nephew George William I of Liegnitz (born 1660, duke 1672-1675), the last governing Piast, his territory was taken over by the Habsburgs as part of the Counter-reformation which forced Catholicism on the people of Silesia. The assets of the Johannisstiftung were taken by the emperor and the Johanniskirche was handed over to Jesuits.  Only after Altranstaedter convention of 1708 were the assets of the Johannisstifung again released for a new school for the aristocracy, in equal numbers for boys of both denominations.  The main building of the Ritter-Akademie was built in the years 1726 - 1738 in the baroque style to the design of the architect Joseph Emanuel Fischer von Erlach. The pupils wore a blue uniform with yellow collar and yellow cuffs, with blue-yellow garrison cap, but no weapon.

In 1811 the academy was opened to non-aristocrats, and by 1901 it became a national school existing until 1945.  From 1945 to 1992 it was the headquarters for Soviet troops stationed in Silesia, now a part of Poland. The building has since been restored.

Teachers and high-level personnel 
 1708: August Bohse (1661-1740), was from 1708 a professor at the Ritter-Akademie
 1788: Karl Abraham baron von Zedlitz (1731-1793), Prussian minister of education and law (from 1770), was from 1788 to 1789 director of the Ritter-Akademie
 1815: Friedrich Karl Hermann Kruse (1790-1866), historian, was around 1815 a teacher at the Ritter-Akademie
 1818: Carl Friedrich Mosch (1784-1859), mineralogist, draughtsman and a writer, was from 1818 to his retirement 1835 teacher at the Ritter-Akademie
 1910: Hans's Ernst count von Carmer Carmer-Zieserwitz (1861-1922), property owner at Zieserwitz, member of the Prussian Lower House and the realm diet, Prussian major, was around 1910 curator of the Ritter-Akademie
 1910:  Antonius Dietrich von Auer (1860-1923), Prussian major, was around 1910 governor of the Ritter-Akademie

Schools in Poland